Virtual Pool 4 is a sports simulation video game developed and published by American studio Celeris as an entry in the Virtual Pool franchise, a sequel to Virtual Pool 3. The game was initially released on Windows in August 2012. It was released to Steam on May 11, 2015, worldwide, after a period on Steam Greenlight. The game has two releases, an offline version of the game, and an online multiplayer version.{{efn|Named Virtual Pool 4 Online}} The game has also had an additional iPad release.

Gameplay
As with other entries in the Virtual Pool series, the game is controlled by keyboard and mouse. The speed at which the mouse is moved forwards determines the strength of the shot being played.

Featuring 35 different game modes, including eight-ball and nine-ball pool, carom billiards, snooker, and various pub games whereas five other games, which are all four types of Russian billiards including scratch pyramid and 14.1 long pyramid are scheduled to be released alongside Finnish Kaisa and three-player cutthroat. Included are different-sized billiard tables such as a smaller bar table, or a bigger championship snooker table. Also included is the ability to edit the size of tables being played including pocket sizes and handicaps Players also have the option of playing the tour, hustle tour or trick shot modes, as well as instructional videos on how to improve in game and on a real table.

In the tour mode, players have the option of playing through differing tours ranking from local competition to international series. The game features real pro and amateur players from across the world, with developers asking pool players to submit information to be included in game. The hustle tour mode sees the player follow "Curly" played by Greg Finley, the game's hustling expert and introduce the player to hustling pool. Curly greets the player in a full motion video, but despite the game mode that is selected, Curly will only play 9-ball pool.   Starting as a rookie in the garages and work the player rises through the bars and pool halls to eventually take on Curly himself. Along the way earning cash to spend on new cues and equipment which you can use to impress fellow hustlers and attract bigger cash prize pots. This mode shares similarities to the Hustle Tour mode in Virtual Pool: Tournament Edition and the career mode in Virtual Pool Mobile, with there being the same locations, and cut scenes to watch.

The trick shot mode features 140 preset trick shots to attempt, and features an editor, for the player to setup new challenges; and send to friends. Virtual Pool 4 states that it can make the players' real pool game improve by saying "So realistic it will make your real life pool game better!" The game attempts this with instructional videos with head of coaching in the "world 8-ball pool association" Steve Daking; and allows the player to attempt the shots in-game. The player also has the ability to customize the portrait of the player character an opponent in any game mode.

A tutorial mode is included in game before any quick game, to allow the player to learn the controls.

Online Multiplayer
The second version of Virtual Pool 4 features game play for multiplayer matches, Single and double elimination tournaments with or without handicap. The modes feature the ability to upload shots to the players profile online, as well as statistical displays of the players wins, losses, world ranking and calendar for planning events. This features an in-game currency known as "V$".Virtual Pool 4 multiplayer'' also features all of the same gameplay as the original release, but without the offline season game modes, and instructional videos. This version of the release features an annual membership fee, rather than a straight up cost of the game like the offline release. However, purchasing the annual fee also includes more V$. The offline version of the game also includes a 1-year subscription of the online modes for free.

Notes

References

External links

Official website

 

IOS games
Windows games
2012 video games
Video games developed in the United Kingdom